Glenea colobotheoides is a species of beetle in the family Cerambycidae. It was described by James Thomson in 1865. It is known from the Philippines.

References

colobotheoides
Beetles described in 1865